Cerrillos Hills State Park is a state park of New Mexico, located  south of Santa Fe. Transferred to state ownership in 2009, it is New Mexico's newest state park. The new visitors' center is located in the village of Los Cerrillos. The park has numerous hiking trails.

History
The Cerrillos Hills were originally known by the Spanish as the Sierra de San Mateo. In 1581, they discovered the lead-silver deposits there, which had earlier been used by the pueblo peoples as an ingredient in pottery glazes. After the coming of the "Americans" the Cerrillos Mining District was created in 1879. The Cerrillos Mining District was added to the New Mexico State Register of Cultural Properties in 1973.

The park was originally created in 2003 by Santa Fe County with the assistance of the Cerrillos Hills Park Coalition. Its name then was the Santa Fe County Cerrillos Hills Historic Park.

References

External links
 Cerrillos Hills State Park
 Cerrillos Hills Park Coalition

State parks of New Mexico
Parks in Santa Fe County, New Mexico
Protected areas established in 2009